Elephants found in Kerala, the Indian elephants (Elephas maximus indicus), are one of three recognized subspecies of the Asian elephant. Since 1986, Asian elephants have been listed as endangered by IUCN as the population has declined by at least 50% over the last three generations, estimated to be 25,600 to 32,750 in the wild. The species is pre-eminently threatened by habitat loss, degradation and fragmentation. Along with a large population of wild elephants, Kerala has more than seven hundred captive elephants. Most of them are owned by temples and individuals. They are used for religious ceremonies in and around the temples, and some churches, and a few elephants work at timber yards. 

Elephants in Kerala are often referred to as the "sons of the sahya" (cf. poem "Sahyante Makan" by Vyloppalli Sreedhara Menon). As the State Animal, the elephant is featured on the emblem of the Government of Kerala state, taken from the Royal Arms of both Travancore and Cochin. It is believed that an elephant that has been captured in the wild, and tamed, will never be accepted by other wild elephants.

Elephants in festivals

Many prominent temples in Kerala own elephants, many of which are donated by devotees. Elephants are a core part of ritual worship in the famous Guruvayur temple which owns more than 60 elephants. The world's only Elephant Palace is constructed in Punnattur Kotta, 3 km from the Guruvayur temple, to house the temple's elephants. A famous elephant, named Guruvayur Kesavan, belonged to this temple.

Almost all of the local festivals in Kerala include at least one richly caparisoned elephant. Elephants carry the deity during annual festival processions and ceremonial circumnambulations in the Hindu temples. The temple elephants are decorated with gold plated caparisons ("nettipattam"), bells, and necklaces. People mounted on the elephants hold tinselled silk parasols ("muttukuda") up high, swaying white tufts ("vencamaram") and peacock feather fans ("alavattam") to the rhythm of the orchestra. Seventeen elephants are engaged for the daily ceremonial rounds to the accomplishment of Pancari Melam in Kudalmanikyam temple. The headgear of seven of these elephants is made of pure gold and rest of pure silver, which is unique to this temple. 15 elephants are caparisoned for the seevili at tripnithura poornathrayeesa temple vrishchikolsavam. This the biggest temple festival in the world. The elephant carrying lord poornathrayeesa will be decorated by swarna thalekkettu( nettippattam made of pure gold from the kings treseory).

Elephants in history and legends of Kerala

Many elephants are featured in the local legends of Kerala. Aitihyamala ("A Garland of Historical Anecdotes") by Kottarattil Sankunni was written in eight volumes; each volume ending with a story or legend about a famous elephant.

Elephant care

Each elephant has three mahouts, called  (പാപ്പാൻ) in the Malayalam language. The most important duty of the mahouts is to bathe and massage the elephant with small rocks, and the husk of coconuts. In the monsoon season, the elephants undergo Ayurvedic rejuvenation treatments which include decoctions with herbs, etc. It is called Sukha Chikitsa in the Malayalam language. Mahouts may be classified into three types, called in the Sanskrit language: 
 Reghawan: Those who use love to control their elephants.
 Yukthiman: Those who use ingenuity to outsmart them.
 Balwan: Those who control elephants with his loud voice

In November 2014, Mathrubhumi reported the incident of a tamed elephant, Indrajit, being released to the wild because of the care and affection (and not because of financial constraints) the elephant's owner, Mr T R Raghulal (managing director of Elite Group of Companies), has towards the elephant. To avoid troubles a tamed elephant may face in the wild, special arrangements were made by the forest-wildlife departments of the Government of Kerala, to ensure a smooth transition. The elephant is 15 years old and is expected to live for another 50 years. Elephants have huge market value in a state like Kerala.

Cruelty against elephants

Around 700 elephants are owned by people and temples. These elephants are rented out for more than 10,000 festivals and processions in which a single elephant may generate revenue up to $5000 a day according to their status. These animals have to endure long and noisy parades, loud firecrackers, may need to stand near flames, travel long distances in open shabby vehicles and walk on tarred roads in the scorching sun for hours, denying even food, water and sleep, in the name of religion and tourism promotion. They are often abused by drunk and brutal mahouts. Around half of the mahouts are found to have drinking problems. January to April are the cruelest months for the captive elephants in Kerala when the places of worship celebrates various annual festivals.

Elephant Biologist V Sridhar accuses, the temple boards of being greedy and co-ercing aggressive elephants not suited to such tasks by going to the extent of hobbling them even with spike chains on their forelegs. He further claims that due to the increasing work load, elephants in their prime (20–40 years of age) seem to be dying prematurely. He suspects that increase in death toll - due to intestinal obstruction and other digestive problems - is indicative of potential increase in physiological and psychological stress. He also expresses his concerns on the lack of trained mahouts - to handle the huge increase of total elephants in captivity - which is a leading reason for the cruel mis-treatment of the animals Further in his opinion, the process of taming an elephant was, historically, based on principles of dominance establishment, which needs revision by creating better awareness and training of Mahouts, but this process cannot happen overnight and it can only happen gradually.

Further reports by Prem Panicker :
 
  Panicker quotes the above from the Animal Welfare Board of India (AWBI) commissioned report on the conditions of the elephants housed at the Punnathur Kotta Elephant "Sanctuary" in Guruvayur. Animal welfare at this elephant sanctuary has come into question due to several videos being posted online of elephants displaying stereotypic behavior, being chained by the ankles with very short chains and one obviously being beaten. Following these allegations in the media and after receiving a lot of complaints, the Animal Welfare Board of India (AWBI) commissioned an inspection of the animals housed in the premises and its facilities. The Commission submitted its report in September 2014. In spite of the report highlighting the pathetic conditions in which the elephants were being housed, the violations of in welfare norms including that of feed, water and veterinary care, no action has been taken by the authorities in spite of numerous reminders by the AWBI.

There have been reports by three official committees that investigated the abuse of elephants at Guruvayur, and which have detailed the abuses inflicted on the Temple Elephants, in violation of various animal welfare laws in India.

On 8 April 2021, the death of Ambalappuzha Vijayakrishan sparked a controversy in Kerala. The elephant lovers accused Devaswom Board and its mahout for killing the elephant. They accused the board and Mahots for torturing Vijayakrishnan. According to them, for several months prior to his death, the elephant were tortured by its mahouts and was used by the board for parading in spite of him having severe injuries.

Notable captive elephants

Notable captive elephants in Kerala include Guruvayur Keshavan (late), Chengalloor Ranganathan (late), Chengalloor Dakshayani (late)), Nanu Eezhuthassan Sivasankaran (earlier known as Kandampully Balanarayanan) (late), Guruvayur Padmanabhan (late), Pambadi Rajan, Thechikottukavu Ramachandran, Chirakkal Kalidasan, Thrikkadavoor Sivaraju, Cherpulassery Ananthapadmanabhan,
Cherpulassery Rajashekharan,Cherpulassery Parthan (late), Ernakulam Sivakumar, Paramekkavu Parameswaran (late), Kongad Kuttisankaran (late), Paramekkavu Rajendran (late), Thiruvambadi Chandrasekharan (late), Thiruvambadi Cheriya Chandrasekharan, Kuttankulangara Arjunan, Puthuppilli Keshavan, Guruvayur Valiya Keshavan(late), Mangalamkunnu Ayyappan, Mangalamkunnu Karnan (late), Mangalamkunnu Ganapathy (late),  Thiruvambadi Sivasundar (late),  Ambalappuzha Vijayakrishnan (late), Thirunakkara Sivan, Puthenkulam Ananthapadmanabhan, Kottur Soman and many more.

Elephant ornamentation

One of the famous families in Thrissur District of Kerala, the Venkitadri family, has made ornaments for three generations, especially for the famous Thrissur pooram, the most famous of the Hindu temple-centred festivals. They make gold plated caparisons, umbrellas, alavattam, venchamaram, and necklaces. They decorate one hundred and fifty elephants with ornaments for temple festivals. Thrissur Pooram, Nenmara Vallangi Vela are some of the famous festivals in kerala in which more decorated elephants are used for procession.
The main chamayam vendors are Paramekkavu devosom, venkidadri, maramittathu balachandran  ( balan mashu).

Elephant Conservation in Kerala
Kottur Elephant Sanctuary and Rehabilitation Centre in the Thiruvananthapuram district is the India's first and world's largest elephant rehabilation centre, opened with an aim to protect and rehabilititate elephants. Other elephant care centers in the state includes Kodanad Abhayaranyam animal shelter and elephant training centre and Elephant Training Center, Konni.

Elephant Survey in Kerala

Kerala Forest and Wildlife Department has conducted a statewide census in Kerala in November 2018, necessitated by an order issued by the Supreme Court. In this survey over 5706 elephants were counted. Thrissur recorded the highest number of elephants (145) and Kannur has the lowest elephant population (3). Kasargod has no elephants.

See also
Cultural depictions of elephants
Thrissur Pooram
Kottur Elephant Sanctuary and Rehabilation Centre
Elephant Training Center, Konni
Kodanad Abhayaranyam animal shelter and elephant training centre
Temples of Kerala

References

External links

Hasthyaayurvedam (Encyclopaedia of elephants and their treatment) The original book is in Sanskrit but Vaidyamadham Cheriya Narayanan Namboodiri has translated Paalakaapyam (Hasthyaayurveda) from Sanskrit to Malayalam.
Association of elephant lovers to protect elephants.
Mahout manual.

Causes of death of Elephants in India.

Elephants in Indian culture
Culture of Kerala